Nardilysin is a protein that in humans is encoded by the NRD1 gene.

Interactions
NRD1 has been shown to interact with Heparin-binding EGF-like growth factor.

References

Further reading